Cesidio Colasante is a retired American soccer midfielder who played professionally in the National Professional Soccer League and USL A-League.

Career

Youth and College
Colasante graduated from Salesianum School in Wilmington, Delaware where he was an All State soccer player.  After high school, Colasante attended La Salle University in Philadelphia, Pennsylvania where he was a 1997 Third Team All American.  He is a member of the La Salle Athletic Hall of Fame.

Professional
On February 1, 1998, the MetroStars selected Colasante in the third round (twenty-eighth overall) in the 1998 MLS College Draft.  The team released him during the pre-season.  In the last summer of 1998, he signed with the Philadelphia KiXX of the National Professional Soccer League who had drafted him in the January 2, 1998 NPSL draft.  In 1999, he moved to the Hershey Wildcats of the USL A-League.  In June 2000, he returned to the KiXX.  In July 2003, the KiXX traded Mark Moser, Kevin Hundelt, Droo Callahan and Matt DeJong to the St. Louis Steamers in exchange for Colasante and Ze Santana.

References

Living people
1975 births
Sportspeople from Wilmington, Delaware
American soccer players
Hershey Wildcats players
La Salle Explorers men's soccer players
National Professional Soccer League (1984–2001) players
Philadelphia KiXX players
Soccer players from Delaware 
A-League (1995–2004) players
New York Red Bulls draft picks
Association football midfielders
Salesianum School alumni